William Rosenberg (1916–2002) was an American entrepreneur who founded Dunkin' Donuts. William Rosenberg may also refer to:

Wilhelm Ludwig "William" Rosenberg (1850–1930s), German-American teacher, poet, playwright, journalist, and socialist political activist
William Rosenberg (actor) (1920–2014), Danish actor
S. William Rosenberg (1916–1990), American politician in New York
William Frederick Henry Rosenberg (1868-1957), English naturalist and natural history dealer

See also
William of Rosenberg (1535–1592), Bohemian nobleman